{{Taxobox
| image =
| image_caption = 
| domain = Eukaryota	
| unranked_regnum = Sar
| unranked_superphylum = Alveolata
| phylum = Apicomplexa
| classis = Conoidasida
| subclassis = Gregarinasina
| ordo = Eugregarinorida 
| subordo = Aseptatorina
| familia = Lecudinidae
| familia_authority = Kamm 1922
| subdivision_ranks = Genera
| subdivision = 
Anchorina 
Ancora
Ascocystis
Ascogregarina
Bhatiella
Chlamydocystis
Cochleomeritus
Conorhynchus
Contortiocorpa
Cotyloepimeritus
Cygnicollum
Cytomorpha
Difficilina
Diplauxis
DitrypanocystisDoliocystisExtremocystisFerrariaHentscheliaHyperidionKoellikerellaKoellikeriaLankesteriaLateroprotomeritusLecudinaLecythionMonocystellaOphioidinaParaophioidinaPleurozygaPolyrhabdinaPontesiaPsychodiellaSelenidiumSelenocystisSphinctocystisSyciaTrichotokaraUlivinaVivieraZygosoma}}Lecudinidae'' is a family of parasitic alveolates of the phylum Apicomplexia.

Taxonomy

There are about 35 genera in this family.

History

The family was created by Kamm in 1922. It was raised to superfamily status by Levine in 1971.

Description

The gamont has a truncated anterior mucron.

The spherical to ovoid nucleus is located in anterior third of the body. It has a central nucleolus.

Syzygy is lateral and often involves multiple associations.

These organisms move by gliding.

References

Apicomplexa families